The Stony Brook Seawolves women's lacrosse team represents Stony Brook University in National Collegiate Athletic Association (NCAA) Division I women's college lacrosse. The team is a member of the Colonial Athletic Association and play their home games at Kenneth P. LaValle Stadium in Stony Brook, New York.

Stony Brook has won eight consecutive regular season conference and tournament championships and have established themselves as one of the top women's lacrosse programs in the nation, advancing to the quarterfinals of the NCAA Tournament twice and spending the majority of their undefeated 2018 season ranked at No. 1 in all of the major polls. From 2017 to 2019, Stony Brook won 29 straight regular season games, and they currently own a 54-game winning streak in conference play, the longest active streak in any Division I sport.

Under head coach Joe Spallina, Stony Brook has built an identity of a national powerhouse constructed out of overlooked Long Island recruits. Kylie Ohlmiller, who played for Stony Brook from 2015 to 2018, holds both the NCAA career and single season records for points and assists. Courtney Murphy, who played for Stony Brook from 2014 to 2018, broke the NCAA career and single season records for goals.

History

Formation and beginnings (2001–2011) 
Stony Brook University formed their women's lacrosse team in 2001 with Danie Caro as their first head coach, with the announcement that the program would begin play during the 2003 season. In the team's first season, the Seawolves finished in third place in the conference but advanced to the semifinals in the America East playoffs, losing 15–4 to Boston University.

Caro left the program in 2005 and was replaced by former Maryland player and four-time national champion Allison Comito. Under Comito, the Seawolves returned to the semifinal round of the America East playoffs in both 2006 and 2007. The 2007 team went 13–4, the first time Stony Brook had won double-digit games, and the team tied for first place in the America East. Comito resigned following the 2011 season, amassing a 42–54 record in her six-year tenure as head coach.

The Spallina era and national prominence (2011–present) 
Joe Spallina, who had won three straight Division II titles as the coach at Adelphi University, succeeded Comito. In Spallina's first season, the Seawolves improved their win total by ten from 4 to 14 as the Seawolves finished second in the America East. Stony Brook defeated UMBC 9–7 in the America East semifinals before losing to Albany in the conference finals, falling one game short of their first NCAA Tournament. Stony Brook finished with a 14–5 record in Spallina's first season as head coach.

Stony Brook had their most successful season yet in 2013, going undefeated in conference play for the first time, winning their second regular season conference championship and beating Vermont 18–4 and Albany 14–3 in the America East playoffs to win their first America East Tournament and advance to their first NCAA Tournament. There, they defeated Towson 8–6 in the first round for their first NCAA Tournament victory but lost in the second round to No. 1 Maryland. Still, the team's final 17–3 record bore the program the most single-season wins to date, beginning the first of six consecutive conference championships. For the first time in team history, Stony Brook was ranked Top 10 in a major national poll.

Stony Brook returned to the NCAA Tournament in 2014 after a 17–4 season where they tied for first place in the America East regular season, including victories over New Hampshire and Albany in the America East playoffs. In the first round, the Seawolves faced Towson again and won 10–8, advancing to the second round where they lost to Syracuse. Spallina became Stony Brook's all-time winningest coach after the season.

In 2015, the first season which Kylie Ohlmiller and Courtney Murphy played together, Stony Brook finished with an 18–2 record. On March 17, the Seawolves beat No. 6/7 Florida on the road in Gainesville, the team's first victory over a Top 10-ranked opponent in program history. They started the season 11–0 before losing to No. 20 Johns Hopkins. After disposing of UMBC and Albany in the America East Tournament, Stony Brook earned the No. 6 seed in their third straight NCAA Tournament appearance. Coming out of a first round bye, the Seawolves lost 8–4 to Princeton.

Stony Brook entered the 2016 season ranked No. 11/8. Although they lost to ranked opponents Florida, Northwestern, and USC to start the season 2–3, the Seawolves would embark on a 15-game winning streak, including wins against No. 9/8 Stanford and No. 20 Johns Hopkins. Stony Brook captured their fourth straight America East title after defeating New Hampshire and Albany in the America East Playoffs; the finals victory came on a last-second comeback. Stony Brook beat Boston College 11–9 in the first round of the NCAA Tournament before losing 7–6 to No. 4–seeded Syracuse in the second round. Murphy broke the NCAA single-season record with 100 goals.

Preseason polls ranked Stony Brook at No. 6/5 to begin the 2017 season. Their lone regular season loss came on March 11, 2017 at No. 3 Florida. Murphy tore her ACL four games into her senior season, but earned an extra year of eligibility. Sweeping the America East for the third consecutive year, Stony Brook beat ranked opponents such as No. 12 Northwestern, No. 9 USC, and No. 4 Colorado before taking down New Hampshire and Albany in the America East playoffs to win their fifth straight conference title and NCAA Tournament appearance. Stony Brook was seeded eighth in a controversial move that was later attributed to New York governor Andrew Cuomo's state-sanctioned travel ban to the state of North Carolina due to the Public Facilities Privacy & Security Act. The Seawolves defeated Bryant 21–6 in the first round and Northwestern 13–9 in the second round to advance to the first NCAA Quarterfinal in program history, where they lost to undefeated No. 1–seeded Maryland 13–12. Stony Brook, despite leading 11–7, could not pull off the upset victory. With 164 points and 86 assists, Kylie Ohlmiller broke the previous NCAA single-season records in both statistics.

Stony Brook was ranked No. 2 to enter the 2018 season, which began with victories against No. 5 USC, No. 23 Stanford, No. 20 Denver, No. 8 Northwestern, and No. 13 Towson. After starting the season 3–0, Stony Brook earned the No. 1 ranking in all three major polls after former No. 1 Maryland lost in overtime to North Carolina. Stony Brook ended the regular season undefeated at 17–0 and beat New Hampshire and Albany in the America East Playoffs to win their sixth straight conference title. Despite a 19–0 record, Stony Brook controversially earned the No. 5 seed in the NCAA Tournament. They defeated Penn 18–5 in the second round. In the quarterfinals, Stony Brook battled fourth-seeded Boston College to double overtime before losing 12–11 on a last-second goal. 

The 2019 season, the team's first since graduating Kylie Ohlmiller, began with a No. 4/6 ranking and a victory against No. 13 Colorado. However, the Seawolves lost at No. 16 Denver on February 24, snapping their 29–game regular season winning streak. On March 3, Stony Brook lost 15–12 at home to Stanford, breaking the team's 33–game home winning streak. Spallina earned his 200th victory on March 16, 2019 against Cornell. After a 11–10 home loss to No. 20 Florida, Stony Brook was unranked but re-entered the polls following defeats of No. 17 Johns Hopkins and No. 14 USC. The Seawolves swept America East play for the fifth consecutive season to win their seventh straight regular season title. In the America East playoffs, Stony Brook took down UMBC and Albany to win their seventh straight America East championship. In the first round of the NCAA Tournament, Stony Brook upset defending champions James Madison 10–9 in overtime. In the second round, Stony Brook jumped out to a quick 4–0 lead against No. 1 Maryland, but ultimately lost 17–8 to snap their 12-game winning streak and end their season.

In 2020, Stony Brook began the season ranked No. 12, and upset No. 4 Syracuse in the Carrier Dome 17–16 in the season opener. They beat Ohio State 20–7 to move up to No. 3 in the rankings before losing to No. 8 Florida on the road. Stony Brook rebounded with home victories over Towson and No. 11 Princeton. On March 12, the NCAA cancelled all spring sports due to the COVID-19 pandemic. Stony Brook ended the season with a 4–1 record and ranked at No. 5 in all three national polls.

In the 2021 season opener, Stony Brook lost 14–7 to No. 1 North Carolina. The Seawolves beat No. 15 USC 15–3, lost to No. 2 Syracuse 16–6 and rebounded by beating No. 16 Towson 10–8. Stony Brook went undefeated in conference play again and easily won the conference tournament to enter the NCAA Tournament as the No. 8 seed on a 12-game win streak. Stony Brook beat Towson 14–8 in the first round and Rutgers 20–8 in the second round to set up a rematch with top-seeded North Carolina in the quarterfinals. The Seawolves led 11–9 late and were eight minutes away from their first Final Four in program history, but the Tar Heels came back to win 14–11 and snap Stony Brook's 14-game win streak, ending their season at 16–3.

Individual career records

Reference:

An asterisk indicates the all-time NCAA record.

Individual single-season records

An asterisk indicates the all-time NCAA record.

Seasons

Postseason results

The Seawolves have appeared in seven NCAA tournaments. Their postseason record is 9–8.

Program leaders

Career

Single season

References

External links 
 

Stony Brook Seawolves
College women's lacrosse teams in the United States
Lacrosse clubs established in 2003
Lacrosse teams in New York (state)
2003 establishments in New York (state)
Women's sports in New York (state)